Pratigya is a novel written by Indian Novelist Premchand. It depicts the compulsions and destiny of an Indian woman living in suffocating circumstances. The widower Amritarai, the protagonist of the novel, wants to marry a widow so that the life of a young woman is not destroyed. Poorna the heroine is an unsupported widow. The society they live in, is against this concept of widow remarriage. In the novel, Premchand has presented the widow problem in a new form and has also suggested alternatives.  This book also contains Premchand's last and incomplete novel Mangalsutra.  He was able to write only a very small part of it.  It is the work immediately after Godan.

Characters 
Amritarai - A handsome lawyer in Banaras whose wife died years ago. Now, he is in love with Prema, the sister of his late wife. His father- in law Lala Badriprasad wants him to marry Prema. He listens to a speech in an Arya Mandir and feels pity on the condition of widows. He takes a pledge to either stay single or marry only a widow. He forces Daannath, his best friend(who actually loves Prema), to marry Prema. Daannath initially hates Amritarai due to his suspicions of Prema being in love with Amritarai and his own friendship with Kamlacharan, Prema's brother.

Amritarai opens ‘Vinita Bhavan’ where he provides shelter to widows. In ‘Vinita Bhavan’ all widows works and earn and live a happy life. When Kamlacharan tries to molest Poorna, she escapes and comes to live in Vinita Bhavan. After, this incident Daannath and Amritarai becomes friend again. At end, he takes pledge that he'll never marry and only serve widows, his whole life.

Daannath - Amritarai's close friend who is a professor in a college. He is a young and simple man. Before the death of Amritarai's wife, he was going to marry with Prema. But, after the death of Amritarai's wife, when Prema falls in love with Amritarai, He decides to abandon his love just for the sake of his friendship. After, the vow of Amritarai, he marries Prema. After marriage, he continues to suspect that Prema still loves Amritarai. Due to his suspicion and friendship with Kamlacharan, he initially hates Amritarai, and always speaks against him. At the end, he realizes his mistake.

Prema - Wife of Daannath, who actually loves Amritarai, but due to his vow, she is forced to marry Daannath. She was devoted towards her husband and is portrayed as an ideal Hindu wife in the novel. She wishes for Daannath and Amritarai to be friends once again and works hard towards this objective.

Kamlacharan - Prema's brother, who was fed up with his wife's nature and had a crush on Poorna, a widow. He provokes Daannath and other people against Amritarai and Amritarai's Vinita Bhavan. He tries to rape Poorna, but she hits him with a chair and escapes. He later realizes his mistake.

Prerna - An ideal Hindu wife who was devoted towards her husband Pt. Vasant Kumar. After Vasant Kumar's death she leads the life of a widow.

Lala Badriprasad - was a famous, rich and kind hearted Businessman of Banaras. He gives shelter to widow Poorna after her husband's death. He is Kamlacharan's and Prema's father.

Sumitra - Wife of Kamlacharan

Pandit Vasant Kumar - Husband of Poorna.

Daannath's mother - Dannath's mother's name is not revealed in the novel and has a minor role.

Summary of Pratigya 
A gentleman named Amritarai lives in Banaras. He is a lawyer by profession but he likes social service more than advocacy, charity is his friend.  Amritarai is married to the first daughter of Lala Badri Prasad, a well-known nobleman of the city, but she and her child die in childbirth.  Amritarai returns to Banaras after two years and by then Lalaji's second daughter Prema has grown up.  Amritarai forgets his anguish on being introduced to Prema and the two fall in love with each other.  Lalaji wanted to marry Prema to Amritarai's friend Daannath, but after seeing Prama's attachment to Amritarai, changes his decision. Amritarai and Prema are about to get married, but one incident changes everything.

Upon being inspired by a speech on social reforms in a temple, Amritarai vows that he will only marry a widow. Lalaji is angered by this pledge that it is against the customs of their sect. But Prema welcomes his decision and renounces her love for him. Now Prema's marriage is fixed with Daannath again; who is hesitant at first.

Vasantkumar, the neighbour of Lala Badriprasad, drowns in the middle of the flood, leaving his wife Poorna, a widow. Thereafter Lalaji offers her shelter in his house. Lalaji's son Kamalaprasad is mischievous and dissolute. He is stunned by Poorna's beauty and keeps trying to obtain her for himself by any means necessary. He tries to implicate Poorna by laying a trap and tries to win her over through lies and deception. Sumitra, who is his wife – gives Poorna patience and inspires her to fight against injustice.

Daannath starts having suspicions that his wife Prema is still in love with Amritarai. with Kamalaprasad's support, Daannath starts going against Amritarai  and also starts publicly criticizing him. Amritarai sells his land and property and builds 'Vanita-Bhawan', which is a refuge for widows and orphan girls, Amritarai wants to collect donations for its operation and faces criticism from Kamalaprasad and Daannath. During a program, goons sent by Kamalaprasad attack Amritarai.

Review
In this novel, Premchand portrays the problems of widowhood prevailing in the Indian society.  Poorna Patra, a touching depiction of the compulsions of the despised and suffering widows in the society.  The characters of Sumitra and Prema are ideal female characters, while Kamalaprasad is the representative of the wicked who oppress the weak. Premchand showed a solution of the widow-problem in economic self-reliance. Premchand himself presented an ideal in front of the society by marrying a child-widow in his life.

See also 
 Premchand, Indian author
 Godan, novel
 Widow remarriage

References

Indian novels